Squale or Software Quality Enhancement is an open-source platform that helps monitoring software quality for multi-language applications.

Squale may also refer to:
Squale Watches, a Swiss watch brand 
Wassmer Squale, a glider designed and produced in France in the late 1960s
Le Squale, a 1991 TV series by Claude Barma

See also
Moha La Squale (born 1995), French rapper
Squalene, a compound originally obtained from shark liver oil
Squalidae or dogfish sharks, a family of sharks in the order Squaliformes
Squalus or Spurdog, a genus of dogfish sharks in the family Squalidae